Ženski nogometni klub Krka, commonly referred to as ŽNK Krka or simply Krka, was a Slovenian women's football club from Novo Mesto. Krka won the Slovenian Women's League eight times, and played several seasons in UEFA competitions. The best result in those was playing the Round of 32 in the 2010–11 UEFA Women's Champions League season. The club was dissolved in 2016.

Honours
Slovenian League
 Winners (8): 2002–03, 2003–04, 2004–05, 2006–07, 2007–08, 2008–09, 2009–10, 2010–11

Slovenian Cup
 Winners (5): 2003–04, 2005–06, 2007–08, 2008–09, 2009–10

European history

Former internationals
 Jana Horvat
 Snežana Maleševič
 Anja Milenkovič
 Alja Krznarič
 Adrijana Bogolin
 Andreja Nikl
 Ksenja Povh
 Monika Žunkovič
 Tamar Kvelidze
 Tamar Nadirashvili
 Kikelomo Ajayi
 Milena Pešić
 Ljiljana Jovanović
 Dragana Todorović
 Maria Makowska
 Marta Gavel
 Martha Dobrowolska

See also
NK Krka, men's team

References

Association football clubs established in 1998
Women's football clubs in Slovenia
1998 establishments in Slovenia
2016 disestablishments in Slovenia
Sport in Novo Mesto
Association football clubs disestablished in 2016
Defunct football clubs in Slovenia